The south coast tornado was a tornadic waterspout spawned by a supercell thunderstorm off the south coast of New South Wales on 26 December 2001, during the Sydney to Hobart Yacht Race. The tornado passed very close to the yacht Nicorette II, which was severely damaged but able to complete the race with a spare mainsail. The waterspout proceeded to strike several other boats with weaker winds. The tornado should not be confused with the severe storm that wrought havoc on the race in 1998.

See also 
List of tornadoes and tornado outbreaks
List of Southern Hemisphere tornadoes and tornado outbreaks

References

External links 
 Forum with numerous images of the tornado

2001 in Australia
2001 in Australian sport
Tornadoes in Australia
Tornadoes of 2001
Sydney to Hobart Yacht Race
December 2001 events in Australia